The Minnesota Golden Gophers represented the University of Minnesota in WCHA women's ice hockey during the 2021-22 NCAA Division I women's ice hockey season.  They won the WCHA regular-season title, but lost to Ohio State 3–2 in the conference tournament finals on home ice.

After the conference tournament, the Gophers were selected as an at-large bid for the NCAA Tournament, gaining the second seed overall, behind Ohio State.  They lost to the University of Minnesota–Duluth Bulldogs 2–1 at Ridder Arena in the NCAA Tournament Quarterfinals.

Offseason

Recruiting

Regular season

Standings

2021-22 Schedule

Source.

|-
!colspan=12 style="background:#AF1E2D;color:#FFC61E;"| Regular Season

|-
!colspan=12 style="background:#AF1E2D;color:#FFC61E;"| WCHA Tournament

|-
!colspan=12 style="background:#AF1E2D;color:#FFC61E;"| NCAA Tournament

Roster

2021-22 Gophers

Awards and honors

 On October 18, 2021, Makayla Pahl was named the WCHA Goaltender of the Week.
 On October 25, 2021, Abigail Boreen was named the WCHA Forward of the Week.
 Forward Peyton Hemp was named WCHA Rookie of the Month for the month of October on November 2, 2021.
 Taylor Heise was named WCHA Forward of the Month and Peyton Hemp was the WCHA Rookie of the Month for November, 2021.
 On December 2, 2021, Taylor Heise was named the National Player of the Month for the month of November.
 Lauren Bench was named WCHA Goaltender of the Week, and Emily Zumwinkle was the WCHA Rookie of the Week, awarded on December 6, 2021.
 Abigail Boreen, Skylar Vetter, and Peyton Hemp were awarded weekly WCHA honors for being the top conference Forward, Goaltender, and Rookie on January 10, 2022.
 Skylar Vetter was awarded as the WCHA Rookie of the Week on January 17, 2022.
 On January 24, 2022, Taylor Heise was named WCHA Forward of the Week, and Ella Huber picked up her first career WCHA weekly honor as the conference's Rookie of the Week.
 On February 1, 2022, Taylor Heise was named as the WCHA Forward of the Month for January.
 Emily Brown was given the WCHA Defender of the Week award, while Peyton Hemp picked up another WCHA Rookie of the Week on February 7, 2022.
 Ella Huber earned her second WCHA Rookie of the Week award on February 21, 2022.
 On February 24, 2022, four Gophers were named to the three all-WCHA teams for the season.  Taylor Heise was a first-team selection, Abigail Boreen was named to the second team, and Madeline Wethington and Emily Brown were named to the third team.  At the same time, Peyton Hemp, Ella Huber, and Emily Zumwinkle were named to the WCHA All-Rookie Team.
 Taylor Heise was named the February WCHA Offensive Player of the Month on February 28, 2022.
 Peyton Hemp was named the February WCHA Rookie of the Month on February 28, 2022.
 Taylor Heise was named the WCHA Offensive Player of the Year on March 1, 2022.
 Peyton Hemp was named the Women's Hockey Commissioners Association National Rookie of the Year on March 1, 2022.
 Taylor Heise was named the WCHA Player of the Year on March 3, 2022.
 Peyton Hemp was named the Division I National Rookie of the Year.
 Taylor Heise won the Patty Kazmaier Award on March 26, 2022.
 On April 1, 2022, Ella Huber was named National Rookie of the Month by the Hockey Commissioner's Association for the month of March.

References

2021–22 NCAA Division I women's hockey season
Minnesota Golden Gophers women's ice hockey seasons